Coordination Chemistry Reviews is a peer-reviewed scientific journal published by Elsevier. It was established in 1966 and covers all aspects of coordination chemistry. The editor-in-chief is P.A. Gale (University of Sydney School of Chemistry).

Abstracting and indexing
The journal is abstracted and indexed in Academic Search Premier, Chemical Abstracts Core, Science Citation Index Expanded and Scopus. According to the Journal Citation Reports, the journal has a 2021 impact factor of 24.833.

References

External links

English-language journals
Elsevier academic journals
Publications established in 1966
Semi-monthly journals